Pardomima phalarota is a moth in the family Crambidae. It was described by Edward Meyrick in 1933. It is found in Angola, the Democratic Republic of the Congo (Equateur, North Kivu, Katanga), Kenya, Malawi, South Africa (KwaZulu-Natal), Zambia and Zimbabwe.

References

Moths described in 1933
Spilomelinae